{{Infobox person
|name = Samantha Weinstein
|image =
|imagesize = 
|caption = 
|birth_date =
|birth_place = Toronto, Ontario, Canada
|occupation = Actress
|yearsactive = 2003–present
|birth_name= Samantha Gail Weinstein
|othername = 
|website = 
|notable works = Heather in Carrie; Audrey O'Hara on Jesus Henry Christ (2012); Sloane in D.N. Ace
}}
Samantha Gail Weinstein (born March 20, 1995) is a Canadian actress.

 Life and work 
She was born as Samantha Gail Weinstein in a Toronto hospital in 1995 to Jewish parents. She started her acting career at the age of 6, in a theatre camp where she had one week to put a play together.

For Siblings (2004) she auditioned with the recital piece, and "had to practice it a lot but eventually really got into the character". In 2008, she told in an interview, "I'd study to be a lawyer or doctor...But I find acting so much fun". Weinstein was screened for Case 39 (2009) and True Grit (2010).

In the independent film Jesus Henry Christ (2012) Weinstein appeared alongside Toni Collette and Michael Sheen.

Weinstein won an ACTRA Award for Best Actress from the Toronto chapter for Big Girl, becoming the youngest actress ever to win that award.

Weinstein graduated from Vaughan Road Academy with Ontario Scholar status in June 2013.

 Filmography 

 Film 

 Television 

 Awards and nominations 
 ACTRA Award, won Outstanding Performance - Female, 2005, Big Girl.
 Cyprus International Film Festival, won Special Mention for an actress's leading role in a short film, 2007, Big Girl.
 Austin Film Festival, awarded Special Jury Mention'' for her performance, 2007, Ninth Street Chronicles.

References

External links 
 
 

Canadian child actresses
Canadian film actresses
Canadian television actresses
Canadian voice actresses
Jewish Canadian actresses
21st-century Canadian actresses
Actresses from Toronto
1995 births
Living people